Stuart Uhlmann is an Australian former sprinter who won the 2002 Stawell Gift.

He was trained by Bob Cooke on the Gold Coast.

Starting from a handicap of 6.75m, Uhlmann won the 2002 Stawell Gift race in a time of 11.98 seconds to beat Greg Saddler and Idika Uduma. He previously won the Jupiters gift in 1993 and multiple gifts around the country.

He is now retired from competing, but he is currently training Jarrod Whittaker who competed at Stawell for the first time in 2015.

References

Year of birth missing (living people)
Living people
Australian male sprinters
Sportsmen from Queensland
Stawell Gift winners